The Ugliest Girl in Town is an American sitcom produced by Screen Gems for ABC. It ran from September 26, 1968, to January 30, 1969.

Synopsis
Timothy Blair is a Hollywood talent agent. He falls in love with Julie Renfield, a British actress who is visiting the United States to do a movie. After the movie is finished, she returns to England. To help his brother Gene complete a photography assignment, Timothy dresses as a hippie and poses for a photo shoot. The photos are sent to a modeling agent in England who assumes they are of a woman. He offers "her" a job.

Knowing this would be the only chance to go to Great Britain and be with Julie, Timothy accepts and dubs himself "Timmie". Timothy has two weeks of vacation to spend as much time with Julie as he can, but when he is about to leave with his brother, Gene loses £11,000 gambling.  This, coupled with the fact that the talent agent discovers the brothers' ruse and demands to recoup his investment, means Timothy has to continue being Timmie for a while longer.

Production
Although the series was bought by ITV for British airings, it was never screened in the London area despite the series being both set and filmed there.

The series theme song, written by Howard Greenfield and Helen Miller and produced by Bill Traut, was recorded by New York City trio the Will-O-Bees and released as a single by SGC Records.

Reviews
In 2002, TV Guide ranked the series number 18 on its "50 Worst TV Shows of All Time" list.

Cast 
 Peter Kastner – Timothy Blair
 Patricia Brake – Julie Renfield
 Gary Marshal – Gene Blair
 Jenny Till – Sandra Wolston
 Nicholas Parsons – David Courtney

Episodes

References

External links 
 

1968 American television series debuts
1969 American television series endings
1960s American sitcoms
1960s American workplace comedy television series
American Broadcasting Company original programming
Cross-dressing in television
Modeling-themed television series
Television series by Sony Pictures Television
Television shows set in London
Television series by Screen Gems